Interstate 610 (I-610) is a  auxiliary route of I-10 that lies almost entirely within the city limits of New Orleans, Louisiana, bypassing its Central Business District.

Route description
From the west, I-610 begins at the Jefferson–Orleans parish line, also the line between unincorporated Metairie and the city of New Orleans. Initially a four-lane freeway, I-610 branches off of I-10 at exit 230 as it crosses over the 17th Street Canal into the Lakeview neighborhood of New Orleans. While I-10 swings southward toward the Central Business District via the Pontchartrain Expressway, I-610 heads due east through a partial cloverleaf interchange (exit 1A) connecting with the one-way couplet of West End Boulevard and Pontchartrain Boulevard. This interchange also serves to connect westbound I-610 to eastbound I-10. Immediately to the east, exit 1A also encompasses a tight diamond interchange with Canal Boulevard, a divided north–south thoroughfare in Lakeview.

Widening to six lanes, I-610 begins to parallel the Norfolk Southern Railway (NS) line as it crosses the Orleans Avenue Drainage Canal from Lakeview into City Park. After passing Pan American Stadium, I-610 crosses Bayou St. John into the city's 7th Ward and becomes an elevated freeway for the remainder of its route. The 7th Ward, which overlaps the city's Gentilly neighborhood, is served by four exits, beginning with St. Bernard Avenue (2A) and Paris Avenue (2C), which form two halves of a diamond interchange. Next is a partial interchange with US 90, which transitions from North Broad Street to the one-way couplet of Allen and New Orleans Streets. This exit (2B) consists of an eastbound entrance and westbound exit. Closely following is exit 3, consisting of a diamond interchange with LA 3021 (Elysian Fields Avenue), a major divided thoroughfare that also provides access to Dillard University and the University of New Orleans.

Nearing the end of its route, I-610 is reduced to its original four-lane capacity while passing through an interchange with Franklin Avenue (exit 4). Consisting of an eastbound exit and westbound entrance, the remaining movements are provided via exit 238A on I-10, as I-610 curves northeast to merge with I-10 once again. Through traffic continues on I-10 into New Orleans East en route to Slidell across Lake Pontchartrain.

Route classification and data
I-610 is classified as an urban interstate by the Louisiana Department of Transportation and Development (La DOTD). Daily traffic volume in 2013 averaged between 68,000 and 70,900 vehicles over the entire route.

History

The idea for I-610 goes back to around 1956, when a consultant firm proposed building a federal-aid highway along the current route next to an existing railroad. The proposed route would cut through City Park. During public hearings in 1958, there was much debate about the highway cutting through the park.

The state purchased the right-of-way in City Park in 1966 and began construction of I-610 in 1971. In 1972, a lawsuit was filed, citing that the project violated a 1968 law forbidding the use of parkland as a route for highways unless there was no other alternative route and steps were taken to mitigate park damage. The state eventually prevailed, and I-610 was completed in the late 1970s.

Exit list

References

External links

La DOTD State, District, and Parish Maps

10-6 Louisiana
610
10-6
Transportation in Jefferson Parish, Louisiana
Transportation in New Orleans